The Eatontown Stakes is a Grade III American Thoroughbred horse race for fillies and mares, three years old and older over a distance of  miles on the turf course scheduled annually in June at Monmouth Park Racetrack in Oceanport, New Jersey and currently offers a purse of $150,000 plus a trophy.

History 

The event is named after Eatontown, New Jersey, a Borough near the Monmouth Park track.

The inaugural running of the event was on 9 August 1971, on the closing day of the 1971 Monmouth Park summer meeting as the Eatontown Handicap and was won by the 35-1 longshot in the field, a six-year-old Chilean mare Flor De Sombra in a time of 1:46. Flor De Sombra was claimed earlier that year by Joseph W. Mergler at Gulfstream Park for $14,500.

The following year the event was run in split divisions. The event has been held in split divisions seven times with the last occurrence in 1987.

The event was taken of the turf in 1977 due to state of the track after inclement weather and held on the main dirt track. The event was held on the main track in 2006 and 2020.

For three runnings of the event, from 1988 and 1990 the race was run over the slightly longer distance of  miles.

In 1996 the event was upgraded by the American Graded Stakes Committee of the Thoroughbred Owners and Breeders Association to Grade III status. The event has held with this status until 2020 when the event was automatically downgraded to Listed class due to the race been run off the turf.

Since 2013 the event has been held as the Eatontown Stakes with stakes allowance conditions.

Records
Speed record: 
  miles  –  1:39.26  Laughing (IRE) (2013)

Margins: 
  lengths –  Jacuzzi Boogie (CAN) (1990)

Most wins:
 2 – Telly   (1972, 1973)

Most wins by a jockey:
 3 – Vincent Bracciale Jr. –  (1972 - both divisions, 1973)
 3 – Nick Santagata – (1987, 1991, 1992)
 3 – Joe Bravo –  (1995, 2009, 2017)
 3 – Paco Lopez – (2015, 2016, 2019)

Most wins by a trainer:
 3 – Alan E. Goldberg (1986, 2008, 2013)
 3 – Todd A. Pletcher (2004, 2006, 2018)

Most wins by an owner:
 2 – Cambridge Stables  (1972, 1973)

Winners

Legend:

 
 

Notes:

‡ In the running of the first division of the event in 1973, Lightning Lucy was first past the post winning by a head margin but was disqualified for interference in the straight after a protest was lodged against her and Telly was declared the winner.

† In the running of the first division of the event in 1976, Copano was first past the post but was disqualified for interference in the straight and Collegiate was declared the winner.

See also
List of American and Canadian Graded races

References

Horse races in New Jersey
Graded stakes races in the United States
Grade 3 stakes races in the United States
Turf races in the United States
Mile category horse races for fillies and mares
Recurring sporting events established in 1971
Monmouth Park Racetrack
1971 establishments in New Jersey